Flacourtia latifolia, synonym Xylosma latifolia, is a species of flowering plant in the family Salicaceae. It is native to Karnataka and Kerala in India.

References

latifolia
Flora of Karnataka
Flora of Kerala
Endangered plants
Taxonomy articles created by Polbot